NE3, or NE-3, or similar may refer to:
 Nebraska's 3rd congressional district
 Nebraska Highway 3, now U.S. Route 136
 New England Interstate Route 3, now U.S. Route 6
 Northern Exposure: Expeditions, a 1999 album by British disc jockeys Sasha and John Digweed
 Outram Park MRT station, Singapore
 NE3, a postcode district in Newcastle upon Tyne, England; see NE postcode area